Lúcio Wagner Freitas de Souza (born 15 June 1976), known simply as Lúcio Wagner, is a retired Brazilian-born Bulgarian international footballer who played as a left-back.

Achieving mild success in Bulgaria, where he won eight major titles during a seven year span with Levski Sofia, he would receive Bulgarian citizenship in 2006 and play for their national team on 15 occasions.

Club career
Born in Rio de Janeiro, Wagner started at Náutico, a club competing in the Campeonato Pernambucano. During his time there, the club was runner-up in the 1994 Pernambucano State Championship. In 1995, he signed with Corinthians Alagoano, who loans him to Benfica in 1997, together with Marcos Alemão, Cáju and Deco. After spending time at the farm team, he moved to Benfica in March 1997, making three appearances during his time in Da Luz, making his league debut on 12 April 1997 against Boavista. After the failed stint in Portugal, Corinthians loaned him to Sevilla, at the time playing in the second tier.

In 2000, Wagner joined CA Juventus in the Campeonato Paulista, playing 39 matches, scoring two goals during the two seasons there. In 2002, he moved to Cherno More in the Bulgarian league, racking up twenty league appearances in 2002–03 season, which led to a move to the larger Levski Sofia in 2003. Appearing for the first time on 8 August 2003, he would assume regular starter role, winning three league titles in 2005-06, 2006–07, 2008–09 and helping Levski reach the quarter-finals of the 2005–06 UEFA Cup where they were stopped by Schalke 04, and the group stage of the 2006–07 UEFA Champions League, after eliminating Sioni Bolnisi and Chievo, being the first Bulgarian team to do so. In 2010, the 34 year-old was released by Levski Sofia after 173 appearances for the Bulgarians.

International career
In 2006, Wagner was granted Bulgarian nationality, and made his debut for the national team on 9 May, in a Kirin Cup match against Japan. He would represent Bulgaria five times during the qualifying stages of UEFA Euro 2008, and once in the qualification for the 2010 FIFA World Cup.

Career statistics

Honours
Levski Sofia
 A Group (3): 2005-06, 2006–07, 2008–09
 Bulgarian Cup (2): 2004-05, 2006–07
 Bulgarian Supercup (3): 2005, 2007, 2009

References

External links

1976 births
Living people
Brazilian footballers
Bulgarian footballers
Bulgaria international footballers
Brazilian emigrants to Bulgaria
Naturalised citizens of Bulgaria
Clube Náutico Capibaribe players
Sport Club Corinthians Alagoano players
S.L. Benfica footballers
Sevilla FC players
Botafogo de Futebol e Regatas players
Rio Branco Esporte Clube players
Clube Atlético Juventus players
PFC Cherno More Varna players
PFC Levski Sofia players
Campeonato Brasileiro Série A players
Primeira Liga players
Segunda División players
First Professional Football League (Bulgaria) players
Expatriate footballers in Spain
Expatriate footballers in Portugal
Association football fullbacks
Footballers from Rio de Janeiro (city)